The Maruman Open was a professional golf tournament that was held in Japan. Founded in 1980 as the Descente Cup Hokkoku Open, it was an event on the Japan Golf Tour until 1994, except for 1984 when it was held without a title sponsor. It was hosted at several different courses.

Tournament hosts

Winners

Notes

References

External links
Coverage on Japan Golf Tour's official site

Former Japan Golf Tour events
Defunct golf tournaments in Japan
Sport in Ishikawa Prefecture
Sport in Saitama Prefecture
Recurring sporting events established in 1980
Recurring sporting events disestablished in 1994
1980 establishments in Japan
1994 disestablishments in Japan